The 1903 Drake Bulldogs football team was an American football team that represented Drake University as an independent during the 1903 college football season. In its first season under head coach W. J. Monilaw, the team compiled a 5–3 record and outscored opponents by a total of 170 to 93.

Schedule

References

Drake
Drake Bulldogs football seasons
Drake Bulldogs football